Longonjo  is a town and municipality in the province of Huambo, Angola. The municipality had a population of 92,103 in 2014.

Administrative divisions
The municipality is divided into four subdistricts or communes:
 Longonjo: 60 villages, 
 Catabola: 36 villages, 
 Chilata: 57 villages, 
 Lepi: 57 villages

Economy
Like most of Huambo province, the economy of Longonjo municipality is primarily agrarian, both farming and livestock raising; however Pensana's subsidiary Ozango Minerals has plans to open a rare earth mine there, in the Longonjo carbonatite intrusion (Mount Chibilundo).

There has been extensive deforestation due to the production of charcoal that supplies Angolan urban areas.  This has produced additional pasture for cattle.

References

Populated places in Huambo Province
Municipalities of Angola